Uchar Hadji (Otshar Yaqub from Aksay) was according to some sources a Chechen, according to some others a Kumyk, elder, who killed two Russian generals at once.

Events in Gerzel aul in 1825 
In the summer of 1825, during the Caucasian War two Russian generals Grekov and Lisanevich gathered more than 300 elders of the village of Aksay in the fortress of Gerzel-Aul. The aim was to impose penalties for the support in Aksay for the rebels, and General Yermolov's intention was also to force the people of Aksay to terminate any relations with the rebels. When the elders gathered, the  Russian generals started insulting them. In return, Uchar-haji stabbed both generals with his dagger. A fierce melee started immediately and ended with all elders dead. In retribution, Aksay was destroyed by Russian forces, and it was forbidden for the locals to ever resettle the land again.

References

Year of birth unknown
19th-century deaths
Year of death unknown
Chechen people
Kumyks